Rafiqul Islam is an Arabic phrase meaning Companion of Islam. It may refer to

Rafiqul Islam (educationist) (1934–2021), Bangladeshi educator and writer
M Rafiqul Islam, Educator, 8th VC of Islamic University, Bangladesh.
Rafiqul Islam (scientist) (1936–2018), Bangladeshi physician and medical scientist
Rafiq Azad (Rafiqul Islam Khan, 1942–2016), Bangladeshi poet
Rafiqul Islam (Bangladeshi politician) (born 1943), Bangladesh Awami League politician and minister
Rafiqul Islam (activist) (1950–2013), Bangladeshi activist
Md Rafiqul Islam, Bangladesh Army Major General and former Director General of Border Guards Bangladesh
Rafiqul Islam Miah, Bangladesh Nationalist Party politician and minister
Rafiqul Islam Chowdhury (d. 2008), Bangladeshi academic and political scientist
Mohammad Rafiqul Islam (officer), Chief of Bangladesh Air Force
Rafiqul Islam (politician) (born 1973), Indian politician
Mohammad Rafiqul Islam Khan (born 1977), cricketer from Rajshahi
Rafiqul Islam (civil servant) (born 1955), Incumbent Election Commissioner of Bangladesh
Kazi Rafiqul Islam, Bangladeshi politician from Bogra